The 1926 Connecticut gubernatorial election was held on November 2, 1926. Incumbent Republican John H. Trumbull defeated Democratic nominee Charles G. Morris with 63.58% of the vote.

General election

Candidates
Major party candidates
John H. Trumbull, Republican
Charles G. Morris, Democratic

Other candidates
Karl C. Jursek, Socialist

Results

References

1926
Connecticut
Gubernatorial